Covert hypnosis is an attempt to communicate with another person's unconscious mind without informing the subject that they will be hypnotized. It is also known as conversational hypnosis or sleight of mouth. It is a term largely used by proponents of neuro-linguistic programming (NLP), a pseudoscientific approach to communication and interaction.

The objective is to change the person's behavior subconsciously so that the target believes that they changed their mind of their own volition. When or if performed successfully, the target is unaware that they were hypnotized or that anything unusual has occurred. Arguably there is a debate about what hypnosis is, and how covert hypnosis should be classified. "Standard" hypnosis requires the focus and attention of the subject, while covert hypnosis seems to focus on "softening" the subject by using confusion, fatigue, directed attention, and interrupted sentences. This is most similar to salesmen talking to customers when they are tired. Critical thinking and questioning of statements likely requires mental effort. The theme of "covert hypnosis" appears to be along the lines of causing the subject to enter "down time". Regardless of if "covert hypnosis" is "hypnosis" by a standard definition, fatigue does appear to make critically thinking more difficult. This might explain why interrogation, military training, and cult-recruitment practices prefer to deprive their new recruits of sleep.

Technique 
Covert hypnosis is a phenomenon not too different from indirect hypnosis, as derived from Milton H. Erickson and popularized as "The Milton Model" in style,
but the defining feature is that the hypnotized individual subsequently engages in hypnotic phenomena without conscious effort or choice. Covert hypnosis, like "Ericksonian Hypnosis", "operates through covert and subtle means... to reach deeper levels of consciousness than are touched by the surface structure of language".
It is the concept that an individual, 'the hypnotist,' can control another individual's behavior via gaining rapport.
During hypnosis, the operator or hypnotist makes suggestions. The subject is intended to not be completely aware, on a conscious level, of the suggestions.

The hypnotist gains rapport
with the listener(s) and the hypnotist maintains psychological congruency
(the act of truly acting towards your goals without hesitation), both linguistically and in one's nonverbal communication. As the subject listens while feeling a psychological connection with the hypnotist and the hypnotist displaying behaviors such as confidence and understanding, the hypnotist then presents linguistic data in the form of metaphor:

In other words, this process builds most likely unconscious states within the listener, and then associates those states through covert conditioning, also known as covert anchoring, thereby forming unconsciously controlled behaviors and thoughts. Often methods of tricking the listener to believe that the hypnotist is talking about something else other than the subject are employed, for instance, by shifting use of time and use of identity in language. One famous example is employed by Milton H. Erickson "and a tomato can be happy".

An example
A state of forgetfulness may be elicited by talking about what it feels like to be in that state in a manner that implies the other person is currently experiencing it. Once this state is at a heightened peak the hypnotist can then talk about that state, relating to a concept like the unsuspecting subject's name (a phenomenon called name amnesia), and the subject will suddenly be unaware of his/her name on questioning (provided the suggestions implied immediate effect and the reader is suggestible enough to be influenced in this way). The purpose of covert hypnosis is to shut down or at least reduce the analytical part of the subject's mind, lest they suspect something. This may be achieved fairly quickly by someone with practice.

In the media
Real estate trainer Glenn Twiddle in June 2010, appeared on the Australian television show A Current Affair. The segment explains how he teaches real-estate agents these techniques to use on unsuspecting buyers of property.

In fiction 
In fiction "covert hypnosis" has been featured in television series, though rather overrepresented. In The Mentalist, covert hypnosis is portrayed in an episode when a perpetrator uses it to control others and attempts to kill her employer. In an episode of The X-Files, a man with a brain tumor gains additional skill in hypnosis, and he utilizes it to escape police captivity.

See also 
 Highway hypnosis
 History of hypnosis
 Hypnagogia
 Hypnosis
 Hypnosis in popular culture
 Hypnotherapy

References

Books
 
 
 
 

Neuro-linguistic programming
Hypnosis
Mind control